Karachi City Cricket Association administers cricket in Karachi.

International efforts 

In 2012, KCCA made efforts to bring international cricket in Pakistan by arranging a match between Pakistan and World XI cricket team but PCB has set to delay the match owing to the recent Pakistan cricket team tour of Sri Lanka

See also 

 Pakistan Cricket Board
 Pakistan Champions Cricket League (PCCL)
 List of First Class Karachi cricket teams
 Karachi Dolphins
 National Stadium, Karachi

References

External links 

 KCCA announced 25-member squads for Inter-district Senior cricket tournament

Cricket administration in Pakistan
Cricket in Karachi